The men's changquan competition at the 2008 Beijing Wushu Tournament was held on August 22 at the Olympic Sports Center Gymnasium.

Background 
The favorite of the competition, Yuan Xiaochao, had been undefeated in changquan in international competitions since 2005 which included gold medal victories at the World Wushu Championships, the Asian Games, and at the East Asian Games. Aung Si Thu and Ang Eng Chong were also projected favorites as they were the silver and bronze medalists respectively at the 2007 World Wushu Championships.

At the Beijing Wushu Tournament, Yuan Xiaochao clearly dominated the competition with a wide margin and thus won the gold medal. The silver medalist Semen Udelov and bronze medalist Ehsan Peighambari impressed with their performances as Udelov ranked 7th and Peighambari ranked 24th at the 2007 World Wushu Championships. Both athletes were also selected through the wild card process by Russia and Iran respectively since they did not originally qualify by placing in the top six. Daisuke Ichikizaki, who was another close contender, missed the silver medal due to a 0.1 deduction.

Schedule 
All times are Beijing Time (UTC+08:00)

Results 
The event was judged with the degree of difficulty component.

References

External Links 

 Official Website

Men's changquan